Zrin is a village in Sisak-Moslavina county, Croatia

Zrin may also refer to:

Zrin Castle, ruins located in Croatia
Zrin, a character in the 2011 video game Darkspore

See also
 Zrinski, a Croatian-Hungarian noble family